Churchill & Sarsden Heritage Centre is a heritage centre in the Cotswolds village of Churchill, Oxfordshire, England.

Overview
The Heritage Centre is housed in the remains of the chancel of a medieval church, the village having been destroyed by fire in 1684. The centre presents the history of the village from 1600 onwards, using touchscreen technology and digital displays. Churchill was the birthplace of the first Governor General of India, Warren Hastings (1732–1818), and the early geologist William Smith (1769–1839).

See also
 Churchill and Sarsden 
 Museum of Oxford 
 List of museums in Oxfordshire

References

Bibliography

External links
 Churchill & Sarsden Heritage Centre website

Museums with year of establishment missing
Local museums in Oxfordshire
Former churches in Oxfordshire
Heritage organisations in England
West Oxfordshire District
Cotswolds